André Gauthier (6 February 1915 – 24 May 1994) was a Canadian lawyer and politician. Gauthier was a Liberal party member of the House of Commons of Canada.

Born in L'Ascension, Lac-Saint-Jean, Quebec, Gauthier was first elected at the Lac-Saint-Jean riding in the 1949 general election. Gauthier was re-elected for successive terms there in 1953 and 1957 then defeated by Roger Parizeau of the Progressive Conservative party in the 1958 election.

References

External links
 

1915 births
1994 deaths
Liberal Party of Canada MPs
Members of the House of Commons of Canada from Quebec
People from Laurentides
Lawyers in Quebec
20th-century Canadian lawyers